is a 1959 Japanese comedy film written and directed by Kaneto Shindo and starring Frankie Sakai.

Cast
 Frankie Sakai
 Izumi Yukimura
 Nobuko Otowa
 Kumi Mizuno

References

External links
 

1959 films
1959 comedy films
1950s Japanese-language films
Films directed by Kaneto Shindo
Japanese black-and-white films
Japanese comedy films
1950s Japanese films